Aleksey Desyatchikov (Алексéй Степáнович Деся́тчиков, 31 October 1932 – 4 June 2018) was a Soviet long-distance runner. He competed in the men's 10,000 metres at the 1960 Summer Olympics, finishing in fourth place.

References

External links
 

1932 births
2018 deaths
Athletes (track and field) at the 1960 Summer Olympics
Soviet male long-distance runners
Olympic athletes of the Soviet Union
Athletes from Moscow